Udaya Shumsher Rana  (born in 1970) is a Nepali politician and a youth leader who served as a Minister of State for Finance from 2017 to 2018. He was the president of Nepal Tarun Dal (NTD) a sister and youth organization of Nepali Congress from 2012 to 2017. He is currently working as a Central Working Committee Member of Nepali congress.

Early life

Personal life
Rana was born in Lalitpur, Bagmati Province, to Sagar SJB Rana and Brinda Rana. He has spent most of his formative life in both Nepal and India. He is married to Urvashi Singh Rana and they have two sons Ayush and Samar.

Education
He received his primary education from St. Xavier's School Jawalakhel, Lalitpur. For his secondary education he was sent to St Joseph's College (North Point) in Darjeeling and completed his high school from Lawrence School, Sanawar, India. He received his undergraduate (Bachelors in Arts) from St Stephen's College, University of Delhi and holds a master's degree from Cornell University, Ithaca, New York (USA). He wrote his thesis on Nepal's foreign policy vis-à-vis India and China, which was titled "Foreign Policy of Nepal: Emphasis on relations with India and China”.

Career
Rana has various publications in both Nepali and English in leading Nepali news media
 and has worked as a consultant to various NGO/INGOs including The Asia Foundation, SNV Nepal, ESPS/DANIDA and others. He is currently the Advisor to the Nepal Shooting Association.

Political career
Just like many Nepali Congress leaders, his political activism commenced in India. During his educational sojourn in Delhi, he established and became the first President of Nepal Students Union, Delhi (Student organization of Nepali Congress Party). In Delhi, he instigated protests and took out rallies in support of the ‘First People's Movement of 1989’ against the autocratic Panchayat System. His interest in global politics and economics led him to join the International Union of Socialist Youth (IUSY) and later was elected as the Vice President.

Upon returning to Nepal he devoted majority of his young days in grassroots politics. By 1998, he was already affiliated to Nepal Tarun Dal and was serving as the district president. While being a member of NTD, he fought his first Constitutional Assembly (CA) elections from Lalitpur Constituency No. 1 in 2008. He lost by a narrow margin of thousand votes. Unfazed by his early loss, he redeemed himself in the Second CA elections in 2013 by defeating by opponent by a little more than 8000 votes. His victory in 2013 started his legislative career. He is currently working as a Central Working Committee Member of Nepali congress. He was elected as the Central Working Committee Member with popular votes at 14th General Convention of the Nepali Congress.

As a member of parliament, he was a member of the Finance Committee 2014–17 and was also a member of three sub-committees that finalized bills that was passed by the parliament as an Act, which are as follows:
Banking and Financial Institute Act (BAFIA) 2015
Cooperative Act 2017
Recommended amendments for the Procurement Act to the PMO.
 He went on to serve as a Minister of State for Finance from 2017 to 2018.

Electoral history
2008 Constituent Assembly election

Lalitpur – 1

2013 Constituent Assembly election

Lalitpur – 1

2017 House of Representatives Election

Lalitpur – 1

References

External links

Nepali Congress politicians from Bagmati Province
Cornell University alumni
1970 births
Living people
People from Lalitpur District, Nepal
Members of the 2nd Nepalese Constituent Assembly
Nepal MPs 2022–present